The Ministry of Education, Youth and Sports of the Czech Republic (MEYS, ; MŠMT ČR) is a government ministry that was established in 1969. Before the federalization of the Czechoslovak Socialist Republic, it was the Ministry of Education of Czechoslovakia.

Its head office is in Prague 1.

References

External links
 
  
Ministry of Education, Youth and Sports of the Czech Republic on European Commission website

Czech Republic
Czech Republic
Czech Republic
Education Youth and Sport
Ministries established in 1969
1969 establishments in Czechoslovakia